Alexander Robertson (1 October 1848 – 13 May 1913) was a Scottish former international rugby union player who played for West of Scotland. He was a Forward.

Rugby Union career

Amateur career

Robertson played for West of Scotland. He was playing for the club in 1868. He captained the West of Scotland side in 1870.

International career
He was capped only the once for Scotland. His debut came in the very first international match in 1871 playing against England at Raeburn Place, Edinburgh.

Military career
He joined the Royal Ayrshire and Wigton Militia.

References

1848 births
1913 deaths
Rugby union forwards
Rugby union players from Ayr
Scotland international rugby union players
Scottish rugby union players
West of Scotland FC players